Belasco may refer to:

People

 Belasco (cartoonist), African-American gay erotic artist
 Belasco (surname), people with this surname

Other
 Belasco (comics), a fictional supervillain
 Belasco Theatre, a theatre in New York City
 Belasco Theatre (Los Angeles), a historic theatre in Los Angeles, California
 Emeric Belasco, a character in the novel Hell House
 Belasco (PAT station), a station on the Port Authority of Allegheny County's light rail network, Pittsburgh

See also 
 Velasco (disambiguation)